Emmanuel M'Pioh (born 24 May 1952) is a Congolese long-distance runner. He competed in the marathon at the 1980 Summer Olympics.

References

1952 births
Living people
Athletes (track and field) at the 1980 Summer Olympics
Athletes (track and field) at the 1984 Summer Olympics
Republic of the Congo male long-distance runners
Republic of the Congo male marathon runners
Olympic athletes of the Republic of the Congo
Place of birth missing (living people)